The Tuen Ma line is a rapid transit line that forms part of the Mass Transit Railway (MTR) system in Hong Kong. It has a total of 27 stations, more than any other in the MTR system. 

The Tai Wai to Kai Tak section (大圍至啟德段) opened on 14 February 2020, while the Kai Tak to Hung Hom section opened on 27 June 2021, thereby completing the line.

During the planning and construction phase, this line was referred to as the "East West Corridor". On 25 May 2018, the finalised name "Tuen Ma line" was confirmed by the MTR Corporation, reflecting the termini of the full line, namely Tuen Mun and Ma On Shan. The full journey time is about 73 minutes.

Overview
The line has 2 maintenance depots at Tai Wai and Pat Heung.

Like all MTR lines, the Tuen Ma line is grade-separated throughout its entire length. It is mainly underground in the urban sections of Kowloon and Tsuen Wan, and at-grade or elevated in the rest of the New Territories. Most of the original Ma On Shan line (between Tai Wai and Wu Kai Sha) is built on a viaduct on land which had been reserved for the purpose of a railway from the outset of the development of Ma On Shan New Town. The line then goes underground through Diamond Hill station and Kowloon City before emerging into open air near Hung Hom station at ground level. The line then heads southwest into a tunnel after the station and descending underground through  and  stations (the former having originally being served by the East Rail line, and the track heading northwards through the latter), before returning to ground level (though still fully covered) at Nam Cheong station. The track then runs northwest through a sealed box tunnel just to the north to and under the West Kowloon Highway through Lai Chi Kok Park into Mei Foo station, which has a ground-level/underground hybrid design. Bored tunnels traverse densely populated Kwai Chung and under the Tsuen Wan line towards Tsuen Wan West station on reclaimed land, after which a 5.5 km (3.4 mi) bored rock tunnel, the Tai Lam Tunnel, takes trains through Tai Lam Country Park.

The line then emerges into open air just south of the train depot at Pat Heung and initially runs at-grade, and later on an embankment, as it approaches Kam Sheung Road station. The rest of the line is fully elevated and constructed on a continuous viaduct, running in a westerly direction through the new towns of Yuen Long and turning towards the south at Tin Shui Wai, before taking a bend towards the Tuen Mun River and eventually terminating at Tuen Mun station.

Construction methods predominantly include tunnel boring machines and cut-and-cover, though the Lion Rock Tunnel between Hin Keng and the Ma Chai Hang Recreation Ground was constructed using the drill-and-blast method.

While road and rail traffic in Hong Kong move on the left, the eastern section of the Tuen Ma line is an exception, as trains move on the right between Sung Wong Toi and Wu Kai Sha. This allows the southbound tracks of this line and the East Rail Line to lie opposite each other at Tai Wai, such that cross-platform interchange could be provided there. This design was to speed up passenger interchange between the East Rail Line and Tuen Ma line to Kowloon during the morning commute, although the reverse transfer would require going down to the concourse level and back up again. This layout is maintained as far as Sung Wong Toi, before the line goes into a stacked formation at To Kwa Wan, which has a split platform layout to allow the tracks to switch sides and adopt the left-hand running used on the original West Rail Line.

Since its opening as part of the KCR system, the interchange station at Tai Wai has not had ticket gates between the Ma On Shan Rail and East Rail platforms, unlike at the former KCR system's interchanges with the MTR system; a trip from either line to the other counted as one ride. There was no direct connection between these two lines and the West Rail while they were part of the KCR network.

Rolling stock
For much of its existence, the Ma On Shan line was, in the Hong Kong context, classified as a "medium-capacity system"; however, it is capable of passenger volumes up to 32,000 passengers per hour per direction (PPHPD), which is comparable to the passenger capacity of a full rapid transit or "metro" system. Furthermore, the line has been upgraded to the standard of a full-capacity system in anticipation of the Sha Tin to Central Link, which will extend it to the heart of Kowloon and result in a merger with the full-capacity West Rail line.

KCRC initially ordered 18 sets of 4-car SP1950 trains, built by Kinki Sharyo, running on the Ma On Shan line; they have all since been converted to eight cars. The train is the same model as the SP1900 sets used on the East Rail and West Rail lines, which runs on those lines with twelve-car and eight-car configurations respectively (previously seven cars on the latter, though all has been converted to eight cars and used on the entire line following its completion). They were the only trains in use until March 2017, when newly built eight-car Tuen Ma line trains, manufactured by CRRC Changchun Railway Vehicles, entered service on the Ma On Shan line. Unlike the trains on the East Rail line, there are no first-class compartments. All trains were serviced at Tai Wai depot and are equipped with the SelTrac IS moving-block signalling system for train protection, with provision for upgrading to the radio-based SelTrac CBTC at a later stage to increase capacity.

The first two converted 8-car SP1900 trains were introduced to the Ma On Shan line on 15 January 2017. During the transition period with both 4-car and 8-car trains in service, passengers had to pay attention to the platform LCD screens and announcements to queue at the right part of the platforms. Since December 2017, the Ma On Shan line has been run fully by 8-car trains and all stations retrofitted with automatic platform gates identical to those installed at elevated stations on MTR's other lines.

The former West Rail line was served by 33 eight-car SP1900 trains built by a Japanese consortium of Kinki Sharyo and Kawasaki Heavy Industries, of which 22 were originally ordered by KCRC as seven-car trains for the initial opening of the line. Up to 26 sets run during the morning peak service with a 171-second headway; MTRC specifies capacities of 52 seated and 286 standing passengers per car. Beginning in January 2016, all 7-car trains on the former West Rail line were converted to 8-car trains in anticipation of the Sha Tin to Central Link; this was completed in May 2018. During the transition period with both 7-car and 8-car trains in service, passengers had to pay attention to the platform LCD screens and announcements to queue at the right part of the platforms. They were the only trains in use on the line until March 2020, when a newly built eight-car EMU, manufactured by CRRC Changchun Railway Vehicles, entered service on the line.

The Tuen Ma line is currently served by 59 eight-car trains: 42 SP1900/SP1950 trains and 17 MTR CRRC Changchun trains, with 6 more SP1900/SP1950 trains currently undergoing reformation works. The line will have a total of 65 eight-car trains once the reformation works are completed.

History

Before the merger of the two major Hong Kong railway operators, the MTR Corporation (MTRC) and the Kowloon-Canton Railway Corporation (KCRC) rail networks in 2007, both the West Rail (opened in 2003) and the Ma On Shan Rail (opened in 2004) were operated by KCRC. Both railways were envisaged to be extended in the near future; hence, Ma On Shan line platforms were built with reserved structures for elongation at a later date.

Both MTRC and KCRC independently submitted their own proposals to the Hong Kong government for developing the Sha Tin to Central Link (SCL) by extending their own existing networks. After numerous revisions of their proposals, the government eventually approved the scheme by KCRC, which involved joining the West Rail and the Ma On Shan Rail via the Wong Tai Sin and Kowloon City districts (the phase 1 East West Corridor), and extending East Rail line to Hong Kong Island's central business district (phase 2 North South Corridor).

After the 2007 network merger, operations of all transport services (East Rail, West Rail, Ma On Shan Rail, Light Rail, feeder buses and Guangzhou–Kowloon through train) of the KCRC have been leased to the MTRC for 50 years. The MTRC also rebranded the three commuter railways to bear the suffix "line" (East Rail line, West Rail line and Ma On Shan line) like their own railways. Subsequently, the approved SCL schemes fall into the hands of the MTRC.

The construction of East West Corridor, which largely followed an alignment proposed by the MTRC in the 1970s as the East Kowloon line and later shelved, began in August 2016. At the time, it was unclear how MTRC would name the new lines or whether they would retain the project codenames "East West Corridor" and "North South Corridor"; the word "corridor" would set a precedent in the naming convention of MTR lines. Speculation of a "East West Line" arose when a photograph of an info plate printed with "EWL" (東西綫) at Ho Man Tin station while it was under construction surfaced. The plate was removed before the opening of the station that year as part of the Kwun Tong line extension to Whampoa. MTRC eventually announced on 25 May 2018 that the finalised name was the Tuen Ma line.

Construction defect and delay
The Tuen Ma line was planned to be fully operational in 2019, but after concrete structures of the newly built platforms at Hung Hom station failed a safety inspection which occurred between December 2018 and January 2019, its full opening was postponed by about 2 years.

 The head contractor of the SCL construction, Leighton Asia, subsidiary of the CIMIC Group, was accused of covering up the defect of the construction until a whistleblower from a subcontractor leaked photo evidence to the local press. This led to more thorough investigations, hearings and inspections behind the set concrete for assessing if it would require demolition and rebuilding the structure from scratch. The Hong Kong government also expressed disappointment in the MTRC executives for their incompetent supervision.

Michael Tien, former KCRC chairman, suggested that it was technically feasible to have the Ma On Shan line be initially extended from Tai Wai to Diamond Hill station instead of delaying the whole line, as this has the advantage of diverging the commuter traffic between Tai Wai and Kowloon Tong stations of the East Rail Line, which is overcrowded during peak hours. However, the then MTRC chairman, Frederick Ma, insisted that they aimed at inaugurating the whole line in mid-2019 to avoid the extra resources required for operating the line in separate phases.

On 18 July 2019, the Transport and Housing Bureau announced that the Tuen Ma line would open in two separate phases. On 14 February 2020, the Ma On Shan Line was extended from Tai Wai station to Kai Tak station because the latter has a crossover track which permits the operation of the station as a terminus. The extension, named Tuen Ma line Phase 1, was expected to alleviate significant congestion on the East Rail line between Tai Wai and Kowloon Tong stations in preparation for the shortening of trainsets as part of preparatory works for the cross-harbour extension of that line. The remaining section of the Tuen Ma line, from Kai Tak to Hung Hom, opened on 27 June 2021.

Future extensions
In May 2020, the Government submitted a proposal for the Tuen Mun South Extension to the Legislative Council Subcommittee on Railway Matters. In addition to the "Railway Development Strategy 2014", which includes a proposal for Tuen Mun South station near the Tuen Mun Ferry Pier, the MTRCL has proposed in the latest project proposal to add an additional station in Tuen Mun Area 16. Building an intermediate section in Tuen Mun Area 16 will require the Tuen Mun Swimming Pool to be relocated. A possible relocation for the Tuen Mun Swimming Pool is at the Tuen Mun Golf Centre; the specific plan depends on the technical feasibility study. If, after research, it is confirmed that the above-mentioned location is not suitable, MTRCL will identify other possible locations. Considering that the detailed planning and design of the project will take about two to three years, the Tuen Mun South Extension is expected to start construction in 2023 and be completed in 2030. The government has invited MTRCL to carry out the detailed planning and design of the Tuen Mun South Extension project, and will negotiate with the MTR Corporation on the financing arrangements for the Tuen Mun South Extension on the basis of the "ownership" model for the project.

Train services
 Weekdays 
 Morning peak: every 2.7–3 minutes
 Evening peak: every 3.3-3.5 minutes
 Weekdays non-peak hours / Sundays and public holidays: every 6-7.3 minutes
 Saturdays: every 4.7-7.3 minutes

Not all trains on Tuen Ma line run the entirety of the line. Shorter trips occur regularly during peak hours and at the start or end of service:

Stations
The following is a list of the stations on the Tuen Ma line. The line passes through Olympic station and Kwai Fong station without stopping, as per the map.

Notes

References

External links

MTR lines
Sha Tin to Central Link